Jorge Pedro Maurício dos Santos (born March 15, 1962) is a Cape Verdean politician who served as president of the National Assembly of Cape Verde from 2016 to 2021.

Political career 
Jorge Santos is a member of the Movement for Democracy party. Previously Jorge Santos was mayor of the municipality of Ribeira Grande de Santo Antao. After that he served as the second vice president of the National Assembly and Chairman of Movement for Democracy between 2006 and 2009.

References 

1962 births
Living people
Presidents of the National Assembly (Cape Verde)
Presidents of municipalities in Cape Verde
Movement for Democracy (Cape Verde) politicians